Eleutherodactylus cystignathoides, also known as the Rio Grande chirping frog, Mexican chirping frog, or lowland chirping frog, is a small eleutherodactylid frog. It is found from the southern United States in Texas, and in the northeastern Mexico in the states of Nuevo León, Tamaulipas, San Luis Potosí, Hidalgo, and Veracruz. Its range in Texas has expanded because of transport in potted plants, and there is also a likely introduced population in Louisiana.

Subspecies
Two subspecies are sometimes recognized, although they are poorly delineated:

Only Eleutherodactylus cystignathoides campi occurs in Texas.

Description

Adult males measure  and adult females  in snout–vent length. The snout is pointed and the body is flat and elongated. Tympanum is visible. The finger tips are slightly expanded. Dorsal skin is weakly pustular, that of venter is smooth to areolate. Dorsal coloration is variable (brown, gray, or yellow-green) and includes dark spots. Ventral skin is translucent. The hind limbs have dark crossbars.

Behavior
Both males and females produce calls, which is rare in anurans. Moreover, male and female calls are remarkably similar. A smaller proportion of females compared to males were observed calling in two Mexican populations. Moreover, calling females were, on average, smaller than non-calling females. The function of female calling is not known, but it might function as an advertisement, similarly as the male calls. Males appear to be territorial.

Reproduction
Reproduction is terrestrial and direct, without a free-living larval stage. Under laboratory conditions, eggs are laid just under the soil surface.

Habitat and conservation
Eleutherodactylus cystignathoides occurs at low elevation coastal plains and at low to moderate elevations in foothills. Individuals can be found in moist shaded vegetation, palm groves, thickets, ditches, resacas, lawns, and gardens. Many records are from urban settings. They can hide under cover objects during the day.

This species is quite common throughout its range and no major threats to it are known; rather, they appear to thrive in the presence of humans. Its Mexican range includes Sierra del Abra-Tamchipa and El Cielo Biosphere Reserves.

References

External links
ARMI Atlas: Eleutherodactylus cystignathoides

cystignathoides
Amphibians of Mexico
Amphibians of the United States
Fauna of the Rio Grande valleys
Amphibians described in 1877
Taxa named by Edward Drinker Cope